Blayney, an electoral district of the Legislative Assembly in the Australian state of New South Wales was created in 1904 and abolished in 1913.


Election results

Elections in the 1910s

1913 by-election

1910

Elections in the 1900s

1907

1907 by-election

1904

Notes

References 

New South Wales state electoral results by district